The UNIS Flyers are an ice hockey club located in Heerenveen, Netherlands. The team competes in the BeNe League and also takes part in the Dutch Cup. Home games are played in the  ice hockey arena  which forms part of the Thialf complex.

History
The UNIS Flyers were founded in 1967 and played their first season in the Eredivisie in 1971-72. The Flyers set the Eredivisie record for the most consecutive championships with 7 between 1976 and 1983.

Heerenveen is the smallest Dutch city currently represented in the BeNe League (although the Belgian city of Herentals is smaller).

Over the years, the Flyers have competed under a variety of different names, since 2013 they have been known as the UNIS Flyers, due to a sponsorship deal with industrial electronics company UNIS Group.

 Names marked with * are sponsorship names.

Championships
 National Championship
 9 times Champion: 1976-77, 1977–78, 1978–79, 1979–80, 1980–81, 1981–82, 1982–83, 2015-16, 2016-17
 Dutch Cup
 12 times winner: 1976-77, 1977–78, 1978–79, 1980–81, 1981–82, 1982–83, 1983–84, 1987–88, 1997–98, 2001-02, 2015-16, 2016-2017

Season results
 Recent seasons from 2005-06 to 2012-13.
Note: GP = Games played, W = Wins, OTW = Overtime Wins, OTL = Overtime Losses, L = Losses, GF = Goals for, GA = Goals against, Pts = Points

Roster

Updated February 25, 2019.

Staff
 Mike Nason – Head Coach
 Jacco Landman – Assistant Coach
 Rob van Aalderen – Team manager
 Theo van der Duin - Equipment manager
 Erik Veen – Physiotherapist
 Piety Elsinga - Physiotherapist

Former coaches
  Alex Andjelic
  Dave Hyrsky
  Chuck Norris

Notable players
  Alwin Assenberg
  Jolke Balt
  Jeroen Beeksma
  Cole Byers

References

External links
 UNIS Flyers 
 Netherlands Ice Hockey Union 
  website TYSC Tilburg 

BeNe League (ice hockey) teams
Ice hockey teams in the Netherlands
 Ice hockey clubs established in 1967
1967 establishments in the Netherlands
 Sport in Heerenveen